Gurupá or Santo Antonio de Gurupá is a municipality on the Amazon River in state of Pará, northern Brazil located near the world's largest river island, Marajó, 300 km upstream from the upper mouth of the river on the Atlantic coast.

The city is a center for palm heart extraction and commerce. It is a municipal seat and major river boat port.

History
Gurupá is derived from the tupi language words guru (mouth) and pa (wide), and is associated with regions where water channels become wider. The word appears in the name of many localities in Brazil.

Gurupá was founded in 1609 as a Dutch trading post that they called Mariocai, after the indigenous peoples living there. It was the third of three trading posts established by the Dutch along the lower reaches of the Amazon and Xingu Rivers. The Dutch traded for dye, timber and mother-of-pearl. They also cultivated sugarcane along the Xingu river, to the south of Gurupa. It was subsequently conquered and occupied by the Portuguese in 1623, where they built the Fort of Santo Antônio do Gurupá (St. Anthony of Gurupá). It became the royal captaincy of Gurupá in 1633 in recognition of its strategic military and trading position.  It was absorbed into Grao-Pará in 1756.

References

Sources
 Pace, Richard, & Hinote, Brian (2014). Amazon Town TV: An audience ethnography in Gurupá, Brazil. University of Texas Press.
 
 Wagley, Charles (1953). Amazon town: a study of man in the tropics. London, Oxford & New York: Oxford Univ. Press.
 http://cidades.ibge.gov.br/painel/painel.php?codmun=150310&lang=_EN

Municipalities in Pará
Populated places on the Amazon
1609 establishments in the Dutch Empire